Events from the year 1447 in Ireland.

Incumbent
Lord: Henry VI

Events
 Torna Ó Maolconaire became Ollamh Síol Muireadaigh.

Deaths
 Sadhbh Ó Mailchonaire, Ban Ollamh Síol Muireadaigh.